CPV  may refer to:

In mathematics, science and technology

Viruses
 Canine parvovirus
 Cricket paralysis virus
 Cryptosporidium parvum virus, a dsRNA virus of the single-celled causative agent of Cryptosporidiosis

Other uses in mathematics, science and technology
 Cauchy principal value, a method for assigning values to certain improper integrals in mathematics
 Composite Pressure Vessel, often gas cylinders made of composite materials
 Concentrator photovoltaics, a solar power technology
 Continued process verification, ongoing monitoring of all aspects of the production cycle
 CP-violation, a phenomenon in physics

Transport
 Air Corporate (ICAO code CPV), an Italian airline
 Compassvale LRT station (LRT station abbreviation CPV), a Light Rail Transit station in Sengkang, Singapore

Other uses
 CPV-TV, a defunct UK media company
 Cape Verde, ISO 3166-1 alpha-3 country code
 Child-to-parent violence, parental abuse by children
 Common Procurement Vocabulary, a European Union legislation introducing a system of codes used by member states in public procurement procedures
 Communist Party of Vietnam
 Cost per view, in video online advertising

See also